Whitehorse North was a territorial electoral district in the Canadian territory of Yukon, which was represented on the Yukon Territorial Council from 1961 to 1974. The district comprised the northern portion of the territorial capital, Whitehorse.

Representatives

References

Former Yukon territorial electoral districts